Scopula quinquefasciata is a moth of the family Geometridae. It is found in New Caledonia.

References

Moths described in 1979
quinquefasciata
Moths of Oceania